Isabella Ginor (Изабелла Гинор, איזבלה גינור) is an Israeli journalist and an analyst on post-Soviet affairs.

Biography
Isabella Ginor was born in Ukraine and immigrated to Israel in 1967. She  studied at Tel Aviv University and is a fellow of the Harry S. Truman Research Institute for the Advancement of Peace at the Hebrew University of Jerusalem.

Ginor was a recipient, together with  Gideon Remez, of the 2008 Book Prize (Silver Medal) by the Washington Institute for Near East Policy for Foxbats over Dimona.

Published works
 [Online=https://books.google.com/books?id=slo2AAAAMAAJ]
 
 
 
 
 
 
 Isabella Ginor, Gideon Remez: Un-Finnished Business: A Never-sent Diplomatic Note Confirms Moscow's Premeditation of the Six-Day War . In: The Sixth Nordic Conference on Middle Eastern Studies : Revised draft. — Copenhagen: Danish Institute for International Studies, DIIS, 8–10 October 2004.
 Isabella Ginor, Gideon Remez: Foxbats Over Dimona: The Soviets' Nuclear Gamble in the Six-Day War. — Yale University Press, 2007. — 287 Seiten — , 9780300123173

See also
Journalism in Israel

References

External links
How Six Day war almost led to Armageddon
 biography of Isabella Ginor

Israeli women journalists
Year of birth missing (living people)
Ukrainian SSR emigrants to Israel
Israeli people of Ukrainian-Jewish descent
Living people
20th-century journalists